Caritas Portugal ("Cáritas Portuguesa" in Portugal) is the official Catholic Church organization in Portugal for charity and social relief, instituted by the Portuguese Episcopal Conference.

Caritas Portuguesa was founded in 1945, with its first statutes were approved in 1956.

From the 50s to mid-70s, its activities have focused primarily on the distribution of food by the Portuguese population, donated by the United States and the host by Portuguese families, children from the countries of central Europe in the post World War II and the beginning of the tensions of the Cold War.

Organization 
Caritas Portugal is a Portuguese confederation of Catholic relief, development and social service organizations operating in Portugal. Caritas Portugal consists of 20 regional member organizations known as diocese

The organization has its national headquarters in Lisbon Portugal, form there it provides general assistance to the regional diocese

See also
 Caritas Internationalis
 Caritas Europa

References

External links
 Caritas Portugal

Religious organisations based in Portugal
1945 establishments in Portugal
Christian organizations established in 1945
Caritas Internationalis